Tabitha's Secret is the second studio album by the American Alternative rock band Tabitha's Secret. The album was released in 2001.

Track listing
 All tracks are written by Tabitha's Secret Rob Thomas, Jay Stanley, John Goff, Brian Yale and ***Paul Doucette

"And Around" - 3:42
"Unkind" - 3:21
"Here Comes Horses" - 4:23
"Dear Joan" - 4:57
"Forever December" - 4:49
"Tired" - 3:58
"Paint Me Blue" - 4:14
"Swing" - 3:55
"Dizzy" - 3:48
"3 A.M. (Acoustic)" - 3:46
"Blue Monday" - 2:51

Credits
Rob Thomas – Lead Vocals, Piano
John Goff – Background Vocals, Guitar
Jay Stanley – Background Vocals, Guitar
Brian Yale – Bass Guitar, Occasional Percussion
Chris Smith and Paul Doucette – Drums/Percussion
Kays Al-Atrakcchi – Additional Keyboards
Engineered and Mixed by – Dave Bell, Mark Cross, John Goff and Jay Stanley

2001 albums
Tabitha's Secret albums